The Minnesota Vikings is an American football team based in Minneapolis, Minnesota, and a part of the National Football League (NFL), playing in its NFC North division. Since the franchise was established in 1960, over 1,000 players have appeared in at least one game for the Vikings.



A

Ameer Abdullah
Husain Abdullah
Bobby Abrams
Steve Ache
Rodney Adams
Scott Adams
Tom Adams
Tony Adams
Xavier Adibi
John Adickes
Grady Alderman
Derrick Alexander (DE)
Derrick Alexander (WR)
Mackensie Alexander
Rufus Alexander
Tuineau Alipate
Asher Allen
Jared Allen
Nate Allen
Terry Allen
Aundrae Allison
Morten Andersen
Abdullah Anderson
Alfred Anderson
Gary Anderson
Scott Anderson
Richard Angulo
Sam Anno
Leo Araguz
Hasson Arbubakrr
Emmanuel Arceneaux
Devin Aromashodu
Chuck Arrobio
Walker Lee Ashley
Matt Asiata
Pete Athas
John Avery
Adrian Awasom
Obafemi Ayanbadejo
Remi Ayodele

B

Jeff Baca
Brad Badger
Dan Bailey
Al Baker
Chase Baker
Rashad Baker
Randy Baldwin
Jerry Ball
Christian Ballard
Gary Ballman
Antonio Banks
Joe Banyard
Jake Bargas
Robert Barker
Billy Ray Barnes
Tomur Barnes
Harlon Barnett
Anthony Barr
Hank Baskett
Anthony Bass
D'Wayne Bates
Jim Battle
David Bavaro
Rick Bayless
Tim Baylor
Autry Beamon
John Beasley
Willie Beavers
Nick Bebout
Hal Bedsole
Chad Beebe
Blake Bell
Rick Bell
Barry Bennett
Darren Bennett
Michael Bennett
Pete Bercich
Joe Berger
Mitch Berger
Bernard Berrian
Bob Berry
Jordan Berry
Ray Berry
Sean Berton
Rufus Bess
Greg Biekert
Matt Birk
Bill Bishop
Desmond Bishop
Joe Blahak
Matt Blair
Paul Blair
Tony Bland
Robert Blanton
Greg Blue
Orlando Bobo
Bookie Bolin
Brooks Bollinger
Conrad Bolston
Steve Bono
Lorenzo Booker
Alex Boone
David Boone
Mike Boone
Todd Bouman
Tashawn Bower
Larry Bowie
Brent Boyd
Kris Boyd
Malik Boyd
Jim Boylan
Garrett Bradbury
Ronnie Bradford
Sam Bradford
Jeff Brady
Jordan Brailford
Don Bramlett
Blake Brandel
David Braxton
Bob Breitenstein
Jack Brewer
Teddy Bridgewater
Doug Brien
Greg Briggs
James Brim
Michael Brim
Jasper Brinkley
Bubby Brister
Charley Britt
Tramaine Brock
Lorenzo Bromell
Kentrell Brothers
Bill Brown
Larry Brown
Mack Brown
Norris Brown
Patrick Brown
Ralph Brown
Richard Brown
Robert Brown
Ted Brown
Terry Brown
Joey Browner
Bob Bruer
Larry Brune
Dave Bruno
Bobby Bryant
Tim Bryant
Bart Buetow
Mike Bundra
Nate Burleson
John Burrough
Brandon Burton
Derek Burton
Stephen Burton
Bill Butler
Duane Butler
Ken Byers
Camryn Bynum

C

Ivan Caesar
Jamie Caleb
Lee Calland
Greg Camarillo
John Campbell
Kelly Campbell
Bill Cappleman
Daniel Carlson
John Carlson
Preston Carpenter
Ron Carpenter
Jay Carroll
Malcolm Carson
Anthony Carter
Cris Carter
Dale Carter
Jason Carter
Kyle Carter
Tyrone Carter
Dave Casper
Matt Cassel
Matt Cercone
Byron Chamberlain
Doug Chapman
John Charles
Corey Chavous
Dan Chisena
Jim Christopherson
Jeff Christy
Patrick Chukwurah
Vinny Ciurciu
Neil Clabo
Chris Claiborne
Jessie Clark
Kenny Clark
Ken Clarke
Leon Clarke
T. J. Clemmings
Duane Clemons
Ezra Cleveland
Marvin Cobb
Robert Cobb
Paul Coffman
Audie Cole
Mason Cole
Al Coleman
Dan Coleman
Greg Coleman
Stacy Coley
Stalin Colinet
Aviante Collins
Calvin Collins
Dwight Collins
Fabray Collins
Britton Colquitt
Jeff Colter
Tom Compton
Bill Conaty
Tyler Conklin
Ryan Connelly
Chris Cook
Dalvin Cook
Ryan Cook
Adrian Cooper
Jon Cooper
Marquis Cooper
Frank Cornish
José Cortez
Kirk Cousins
Sam Cowart
Fred Cox
Roger Craig
Steve Craig
Scott Crichton
Henri Crockett
Carlester Crumpler
Brad Culpepper
Daunte Culpepper
Ed Culpepper
Douglas Cunningham
Randall Cunningham
Rick Cunningham
Gary Cuozzo
Travis Curtis
Austin Cutting

D

Bernard Dafney
Carroll Dale
Antico Dalton
LeShun Daniels
Rick Danmeier
Cameron Dantzler
Christian Darrisaw
Ron Daugherty
Brian Davis
Davion Davis
Doug Davis
Greg Davis
John Davis
Nick Davis
Rod Davis
Todd Davis
Wyatt Davis
Dale Dawson
Rhett Dawson
Larry Dean
Ted Dean
Chris DeGeare
Greg DeLong
Jack Del Rio
Calvin Demery
Earl Denny
Al Denson
Bob Denton
Andrew DePaola
Dean Derby
Kevin Devine
Jim Dick
Paul Dickson
Stefon Diggs
Scott Dill
Brandon Dillon
Terry Dillon
Steve Dils
Ryan D'Imperio
Cris Dishman
Ahmad Dixon
David Dixon
Josh Doctson
Chris Doleman
Oscar Donahue
Myles Dorn
Nat Dorsey
Mike Doss
Devante Downs
D. J. Dozier
Dakota Dozier
Vladimir Ducasse
Bill Dugan
Jeff Dugan
Doug Dumler
Mark Dusbabek
Troy Dye

E

Nick Easton
Adimchinobe Echemandu
Paul Edinger
Brad Edwards
Dixon Edwards
Dovonte Edwards
Jimmy Edwards
Ray Edwards
Pat Eilers
Mike Eischeid
Clifton Eley
Pat Elflein
Ben Ellefson
Carl Eller
Aaron Elling
Kenrick Ellis
Rhett Ellison
Neil Elshire
Marcus Epps
Hayden Epstein
Chuck Evans
David Evans
Fred Evans
Eric Everett
Antone Exum

F

Hap Farber
Heath Farwell
Ciatrick Fason
Paul Faust
Brett Favre
Willie Fears
Grant Feasel
Jerome Felton
Rick Fenney
Bob Ferguson
Charley Ferguson
Robert Ferguson
Jay Fiedler
Mark Fields
Steve Finch
Jason Fisk
Jamie Fitzgerald
Mike Fitzgerald
Paul Flatley
Michael Floyd
Sharrif Floyd
Toniu Fonoti
Chris Foote
Kai Forbath
Chase Ford
Chuck Foreman
Melvin Fowler
Dennis Fowlkes
Eric Frampton
Tom Franckhauser
Donald Frank
Josh Freeman
Steve Freeman
Gus Frerotte
David Frisch
Isaac Fruechte
Phil Frye
Corey Fuller
Darrell Fullington
Brandon Fusco

G

Tony Galbreath
Frank Gallagher
Jim Gallery
Laroni Gallishaw
Wayne Gallman
John Galvin
Rich Gannon
Teddy Garcia
Dave Garnett
Winfield Garnett
Billy Gault
William Gay
Ben Gedeon
Jeff George
Ron George
John Gerak
Toby Gerhart
Carl Gersbach
Willie Gillespie
John Gilliam
Jeff Gladney
Jason Glenn
Vencie Glenn
Andrew Glover
Robert Goff
Adam Goldberg
Bob Goodridge
Charlie Goodrum
Hunter Goodwin
Charles Gordon
Scottie Graham
MarQueis Gray
Torrian Gray
Dick Grecni
Robert Green
Marcellus Greene
Chad Greenway
Everson Griffen
Cedric Griffin
Robert Griffith
Otis Grigsby
Bob Grim
Ron Groce
Neal Guggemos
Letroy Guion
Eric Guliford
Jim Gustafson

H

Adam Haayer
Brian Habib
Dale Hackbart
John Haines
Dick Haley
Lemanski Hall
Steve Hall
Tom Hall
Windlan Hall
C. J. Ham
Wes Hamilton
Shelly Hammonds
Alonzo Hampton
Harrison Hand
Ben Hanks
Tom Hannon
Don Hansen
Mark Hanson
Jim Hargrove
Sam Harrell
Anthony Harris
Billy Harris
Darryl Harris
James Harris
Joe Harris
John Harris
Michael Harris
Napoleon Harris
Paul Harris
Robert Harris
Steve Harris
Martin Harrison
Mike Hartenstine
Percy Harvin
Clint Haslerig
Don Hasselbeck
Matthew Hatchette
Rip Hawkins
Leo Hayden
Ray Hayes
Tae Hayes
Jeff Hazuga
E. J. Henderson
Erin Henderson
John Henderson
Keith Henderson
Wymon Henderson
Hale Hentges
Matt Hernandez
Chris Herndon
Anthony Herrera
David Herron
Artis Hicks
Maurice Hicks
Wally Hilgenberg
Gary Hill
Holton Hill
King Hill
Rashod Hill
Shaun Hill
Ira Hillary
Ronnie Hillman
Carl Hilton
John Hilton
George Hinkle
Chris Hinton
Jimmy Hitchcock
Leroy Hoard
Gerald Hodges
Kelly Holcomb
Darius Holland
John Holland
Alexander Hollins
Randy Holloway
Rob Holmberg
Bruce Holmes
Jalyn Holmes
Issiac Holt
Jim Hough
Bobby Houston
Chris Hovan
Bryan Howard
David Howard
Willie Howard
Keenan Howry
Steve Hutchinson
Jerry Huth
Dave Huffman
Mike Hughes
Don Hultz
Danielle Hunter
Will Hunter

I

Donald Igwebuike
George Iloka
Darryl Ingram
Ken Irvin
Tim Irwin
Danny Isidora
Qadry Ismail
Ron Israel

J

Alfred Jackson
Harold Jackson
Joey Jackson
Tarvaris Jackson
Nate Jacquet
Cedric James
Craig James
Dick James
Erasmus James
A. J. Jefferson
Justin Jefferson
Noel Jenke
Carlos Jenkins
Izel Jenkins
Michael Jenkins
Greg Jennings
Bill Jobko
Bethel Johnson
Bisi Johnson
Brad Johnson
Charles Johnson
Charlie Johnson (OG)
Charlie Johnson (DT)
Chris Johnson
Dennis Johnson
Eddie Johnson
Gene Johnson
George Johnson
Henry Johnson
Jaleel Johnson
Jaymar Johnson
Joe Johnson
Ken Johnson
Lee Johnson
Marcus Johnson
Olrick Johnson
Sammy Johnson
Spencer Johnson
Toby Johnson
Tom Johnson
Tyrell Johnson
Lance Johnstone
Brett Jones
Chris Jones
Clinton Jones
Hassan Jones
Henry Jones
Mike Jones (TE)
Mike Jones (WR)
Patrick Jones II
Rushen Jones
Shawn Jones
Wayne Jones
Andrew Jordan
Jeff Jordan
Steve Jordan
Greg Joseph
Linval Joseph
Don Joyce

K

Josh Kaddu
Matt Kalil
Todd Kalis
Joe Kapp
Rich Karlis
Karl Kassulke
Matt Katula
Jayron Kearse
Case Keenum
Mark Kellar
Eric Kelly
Lewis Kelly
Eric Kendricks
Jimmy Kennedy
Zac Kerin
Brady Keys
Keith Kidd
Phil King
Doug Kingsriter

John Kirby
William Kirksey
Jim Kleinsasser
Josh Kline
Chris Kluwe
Greg Koch
Ross Kolodziej
Terry Kosens
Kurt Knoff
Kent Kramer
Tommy Kramer
Paul Krause

L

Bob Lacey
Corbin Lacina
Chuck Lamson
Emmanuel Lamur
Jim Langer
Bill Lapham
Gary Larsen
Jim Lash
Steve Lawson
Ben Leber
Terry LeCount
Amp Lee
Bob Lee
Carl Lee
Jim Leo
Darrell Lester
Greg Lewis
Leo Lewis
Brody Liddiard
Errol Linden
Everett Lindsay
Jim Lindsey
Zach Line
Rob Lingenfelter
Cliff Livingston
Chris Liwienski
Phil Loadholt
Jeff Locke
Cullen Loeffler
Jake Long
Ryan Longwell
Fletcher Louallen
Terry Love
Kirk Lowdermilk
Derrel Luce
Bob Lurtsema
Mike Lush
Blake Lynch
James Lynch
Billy Lyon

M

Dylan Mabin
Mark MacDonald
Earsell Mackbee
Maurice Mann
Archie Manning
Sean Mannion
Greg Manusky
Ed Marinaro
Jim Marshall
Larry Marshall
Amos Martin
Billy Martin
Chris Martin
Doug Martin
Steve Martin
Tommy Mason
Hercules Mata'afa
Alexander Mattison
Andy Maurer
Michael Mauti
Marc May
Doug Mayberry
Michael Mayes
Kivuusama Mays
Stafford Mays
Michael Mayes
Marcus McCauley
Brent McClanahan
Skip McClendon
John McCormick
Sam McCullum
Mike McCurry
Ed McDaniel
Randall McDaniel
Kevin McDermott
Mardye McDole
Ramos McDonald
Hugh McElhenny
Reggie McElroy
Mike McGill
Lamar McGriggs
Marlin McKeever
Tyrone McKenzie
Bryant McKinnie
Jerick McKinnon
Jim McMahon
Audray McMillian
Billy McMullen
Donovan McNabb
Fred McNeill
Tom McNeill
Dan McQuaid
Bill McWatters
Johnny McWilliams
Nate Meadors
Tim Meamber
Mike Mercer
Mike Merriweather
Josh Metellus
Wayne Meylan
Phil Micech
Tom Michel
Dave Middleton
Keith Millard
Corey Miller
Kevin Miller
Larry Miller
Robert Miller
Ted Million
Garrett Mills
John Henry Mills
Charles Mincy
Jayme Mitchell
Marvin Mitchell
Melvin Mitchell
Kenny Mixon
Fred Molden
Pete Monty
Warren Moon
Leonard Moore
Manfred Moore
Mewelde Moore
Zach Moore
David Morgan II
Don Morgan
Kyle Morrell
Jack Morris
Mike Morris
Harold Morrow
C. J. Mosley
Randy Moss
Rich Mostardi
Mike Mularkey
Mark Mullaney
Captain Munnerlyn
Fred Murphy
Yo Murphy
Eddie Murray
Latavius Murray
Najee Mustafaa
Frank Myers

N

Peter Najarian
Martin Nance
Mike Nattiel
Larry Ned
Ben Nelson
Chuck Nelson
Darrin Nelson
David Nelson
Jim Nelson
Rhett Nelson
Richard Newbill
Keith Newman
Terence Newman
Harry Newsome
Tim Newton
Yannick Ngakoue
Hardy Nickerson
Steve Niehaus
Roosevelt Nix
Al Noga
Keith Nord
Tony Norman
Gabe Northern
Storm Norton
Brent Novoselsky
Kene Nwangwu

O

Terry Obee
Dave O'Brien
Ifeadi Odenigbo
Willie Offord
Kenny Onatolu
Andre O'Neal
Brian O'Neill
Frank Ori
Dave Osborn
K. J. Osborn
Clancy Osborne
Jeff Overbaugh
Richard Owens

P

Alan Page
Jarrad Page
David Palmer
Mitch Palmer
Anthony Parker
Rickey Parks
David Parry
Doug Paschal
Cordarrelle Patterson
Jerry Patton
Bryce Paup
Karl Paymah
Eddie Payton
J. C. Pearson
John Pentecost
Pete Perreault
Jason Perry
Dick Pesonen
Ken Petersen
Adrian Peterson
Patrick Peterson
Anthony Phillips
Bobby Phillips
Joe Phillips
Red Phillips
Michael Pierce
Artose Pinner
Kurt Ploeger
Ray Poage
Randy Poltl
Christian Ponder
Ron Porter
Art Powell
John Powers
Shaun Prater
Travis Prentice
Jim Prestel
Jabari Price
Anthony Prior
Ted Provost
MyCole Pruitt
Palmer Pyle

Q
Ryan Quigley
Kelly Quinn

R

Mike Rabold
John Randle
Al Randolph
Ahmad Rashad
Randy Rasmussen
Mistral Raymond
Jarvis Redwine
Bobby Reed
D'Aundre Reed
Jake Reed
Oscar Reed
Jerry Reichow
Riley Reiff
Mike Reilly
Allen Reisner
Mike Remmers
Lance Rentzel
Fuad Reveiz
Darius Reynaud
Xavier Rhodes
Buster Rhymes
Benny Ricardo
Allen Rice
Sidney Rice
Greg Richardson
Kyle Richardson
Sheldon Richardson
Tony Richardson
Curtis Riley
Steve Riley
Fred Robbins
Brian Robison
Aldrick Robinson
Edmond Robinson
Gerald Robinson
Josh Robinson
Koren Robinson
Marcus Robinson
Mark Rodenhauser
Chris Rogers
Nick Rogers
Roderick Rogers
Dave Roller
George Rose
Mike Rosenthal
Ted Rosnagle
Derek Ross
Curtis Rouse
Justin Rowland
Karl Rubke
Dwayne Rudd
Kyle Rudolph
Pat Russ
Brian Russell

S

Sean Salisbury
Dru Samia
Ron Sams
Ken Sanders
Jamarca Sanford
Benny Sapp
Bob Sapp
Craig Sauer
Talance Sawyer
Mike Saxon
John Scardina
Ed Schenk
Roy Schmidt
Bob Schmitz
Bob Schnelker
Adam Schreiber
Jeff Schuh
Geoff Schwartz
Carey Scott
Darrion Scott
Randy Scott
Todd Scott
Bucky Scribner
Ron Selesky
Andrew Sendejo
Robin Sendlein
Joe Senser
Wasswa Serwanga
Ed Sharockman
Tajae Sharpe
Darren Sharper
George Shaw
Terrance Shaw
Jerry Shay
Austin Shepherd
Ashley Sheppard
Lito Sheppard
Marcus Sherels
Will Sherman
Visanthe Shiancoe
Lebron Shields
Jeff Siemon
Arnie Simkus
Howard Simpson
Jerome Simpson
William Sims
Jeremiah Sirles
Scott Sisson
Mike Slaton
Andre Smith
Cameron Smith
Cedric Smith
Daryl Smith
Dwight Smith
Fernando Smith
Gordon Smith
Greg Smith
Harrison Smith
Irv Smith Jr.
Jimmy Smith
Khreem Smith
Lyman Smith
Onterrio Smith
Raonall Smith
Robert Smith (DE)
Robert Smith (RB)
Rodney Smith
Steve Smith
Tye Smith
Wayne Smith
Ihmir Smith-Marsette
Fred Smoot
Norm Snead
Matt Snider
Ariel Solomon
Jesse Solomon
Willie Spencer
Charles Stackhouse
Timothy Starks
Robert Steele
Robert Steeples
Bob Stein
Jan Stenerud
Mike Stensrud
Joe Stepanek
Shamar Stephen
Mac Stephens
Todd Steussie
James Stewart
Mark Stewart
Ken Stills
Luke Stocker
Steve Stonebreaker
Thomas Strauthers
Fred Strickland
Korey Stringer
Scott Studwell
John Sullivan
Charlie Sumner
Milt Sunde
Chazz Surratt
Doug Sutherland
Archie Sutton
Paul Sverchek
Bill Swain
John Swain
Dennis Swilley

T

Naufahu Tahi
Darryl Talley
Cordrea Tankersley
Thomas Tapeh
Fran Tarkenton
Ben Tate
Robert Tate
Pete Tatman
Terry Tausch
Chester Taylor
Eric Taylor
Travis Taylor
Willie Teal
Mike Teeter
Derek Tennell
Keith Thibodeaux
Adam Thielen
Andre Thomas
Broderick Thomas
Dontarrious Thomas
Henry Thomas
Orlando Thomas
Roc Thomas
Mike Tice
Mike Tilleman
Mick Tingelhoff
Dave Tobey
Dalvin Tomlinson
Gino Torretta
Justin Trattou
Laquon Treadwell
Mel Triplett
Olanda Truitt
Jason Trusnik
Esera Tuaolo
Bob Tucker
John Turner
Maurice Turner
Mike Turner

U

Kenechi Udeze
Oli Udoh

V

Ron Vander Kelen
Sean Vanhorse
Larry Vargo
Ruben Vaughan
John Vella
Jim Vellone
Nick Vigil
Stu Voigt

W

Billy Waddy
Bobby Wade
Danny Wagoner
Van Waiters
Bobby Walden
Adam Walker
Denard Walker
Frank Walker
Herschel Walker
Jay Walker
Jimmy Walker
Jackie Wallace
Mike Wallace
Blair Walsh
Chris Walsh
Troy Walters
John Ward
Lonnie Warwick
Dewayne Washington
Gene Washington
Harry Washington
Armon Watts
Brandon Watts
Trae Waynes
Stephen Weatherly
J'Marcus Webb
Joe Webb
Kevin Webster
Tripp Welborne
Austin Wentworth
Charlie West
Ronnie West
Dede Westbrook
Leonard Wheeler
Danta Whitaker
Ronyell Whitaker
Brad White
Ed White
James White
Sammy White
Jason Whittle
Jermaine Wiggins
Solomon Wilcots
Matt Wile
Chuck Wiley
Kenny Willekes
A. D. Williams
Ben Williams
Brian Williams
Jeff Williams
Jimmy Williams
Kevin Williams
Madieu Williams
Moe Williams
Pat Williams
Tank Williams
Tony Williams
Walt Williams
Troy Williamson
Leonard Willis
Antonio Wilson
Brett Wilson
David Wilson
Eric Wilson
Tommy Wilson
Wade Wilson
Wayne Wilson
Antoine Winfield
Chuck Winfrey
Roy Winston
Phil Wise
Cory Withrow
James Wofford
Craig Wolfley
Jeff Womack
Kailee Wong
D. J. Wonnum
Mike Wood
Xavier Woods
Corey Wootton
Barry Word
Shawn Worthen
Fearon Wright
Felix Wright
Jarius Wright
Jeff Wright
Kenny Wright
Nate Wright
Ellis Wyms
Spergon Wynn

Y

Ray Yakavonis
Eddie Yarbrough
Ron Yary
Max Yates
Albert Young
Jim Young
Rickey Young
Frank Youso

Z

Godfrey Zaunbrecher
Gary Zimmerman
Brandon Zylstra

External links
Minnesota Vikings All-Time roster

 
Players